Ahmed Abdullah (born 29 June 1968) is an Egyptian swimmer. He competed in the men's 200 metre butterfly at the 1988 Summer Olympics.

References

1968 births
Living people
Egyptian male swimmers
Olympic swimmers of Egypt
Swimmers at the 1988 Summer Olympics
People from Mansoura, Egypt